Yalçın or Yalcin is a given name and a surname of Turkic origin. It may refer to:

Given name
 Yalchin Rzazadeh (born 1969), a Soviet-period Azerbaijani pop singer
 Yalçın Akdoğan (born 1969), Turkish politician
 Yalçın Ayhan (born 1982), Turkish footballer
 Yalçın Granit (born 1932), Turkish basketball player, coach and sports journalist
 Yalçın Küçük (born 1938), Turkish socialist writer, philosopher, economist and historian
 Yalçın Topçu (born 1957), Turkish politician

Surname
 Lev Yalcin (born 1985), professional footballer
 Nihal Yalçın (born 1981), Turkish actress
 Pınar Yalçın (born 1988), Turkish-Swedish women's footballer
 Robin Yalçın (born 1994), German footballer of Turkish descent
 Saygin Yalcin (born 1985), German businessman based in Dubai of Turkish descent 
 Sergen Yalçın (born 1972), Turkish footballer
 Serkan Yalçın (born 1982), Turkish footballer
 Soner Yalçın (born 1966), Turkish journalist and writer
 Taner Yalçın (born 1990), Turkish-German footballer

Turkish-language surnames
Turkish masculine given names